Tribbey may refer to:
Tribbey, Kentucky, a community in Perry County, Kentucky
Tribbey, Oklahoma, a community in Pottawatomie County, Oklahoma